Görömböly is a place in Miskolc, Hungary.

Görömböly was once known for their wine. However, due to a spread of Phylloxera, the amount of vineyards in the city plummeted. At one point, it had 1048 hectares of vineyards, though people still produce grapes in cellars, therefore keeping their village's character.

References

External links 

Official sites of the city and city parts
 Official website 
 Görömböly on the official website of Miskolc tourism 
 Official website of Miskolc tourist card 

Neighbourhoods of Miskolc
Former municipalities of Hungary